Robert Owen Beckett (April 8, 1936 – April 9, 2019) was a Canadian ice hockey centre. He played for the Boston Bruins of the National Hockey League between 1957 and 1964, as well as for the several teams of the minor leagues. He died in 2019.

Career statistics

Regular season and playoffs

References

External links
 

1936 births
2019 deaths
Barrie Flyers players
Boston Bruins players
Canadian ice hockey centres
Galt Black Hawks players
Ice hockey people from Ontario
Providence Reds players
Quebec Aces (QSHL) players
Springfield Indians players
Sportspeople from Markham, Ontario
Victoria Cougars (1949–1961) players